Plicatura is a fungal genus in the order Agaricales. It is incertae sedis with respect to familial placement within the order, although Kirk and colleagues (Dictionary of the Fungi, 10th edition, 2008) consider it likely aligned with either the Amylocorticiaceae or the Tricholomataceae. The genus, circumscribed by Charles Horton Peck in 1872, contains the single species Plicatura nivea (synonymous with Plicatura alni Peck 1872).

References

Agaricales enigmatic taxa
Taxa described in 1872
Monotypic Agaricales genera
Taxa named by Charles Horton Peck